Christian Marquand (15 March 1927 – 22 November 2000) was a French actor, screenwriter and film director. Born in Marseille, he was born to a Spanish father and an Arab mother, and his sister was film director Nadine Trintignant. He was often cast as a heartthrob in French films of the 1950s.

Career
Marquand's first film appearance was in 1946, as a footman in Jean Cocteau's Beauty and the Beast (La Belle et la Bête).  After a few more small parts, he was prominently featured in Christian-Jaque's Lucrèce Borgia (1953) as one of Lucrezia's lovers, and as an Austrian soldier in Luchino Visconti's Senso (1954).

In 1956, he was directed by Roger Vadim in And God Created Woman (Et Dieu... créa la femme) opposite Brigitte Bardot. That film's success led to starring roles in the movies No Sun in Venice (1957), Temptation (1959), and The Big Show (1960) and leads opposite actresses Maria Schell, Jean Seberg, and Annie Girardot.

In 1962, Marquand appeared as French Naval Commando leader Philippe Kieffer in Darryl F. Zanuck's World War II movie The Longest Day, which led to further roles in international productions such as Behold a Pale Horse (1964), Lord Jim (1965) and The Flight of the Phoenix (1965).

He appeared in feature films and television throughout the 1970s, and played a French plantation owner in Francis Ford Coppola's re-edited Vietnam war epic Apocalypse Now Redux (1979/2001). His last performance was in a 1987 French TV mini-series. He directed two films, Les Grands Chemins (1963) and the all-star sex farce Candy (1968).

Personal life
Marquand was married to French actress Tina Aumont from 1963 to 1966, marrying her when she was 17 and he was 36. In the 1970s, he lived with French actress Dominique Sanda, 21 years his junior, with whom he had a son, Yann. He was a close friend of Marlon Brando, who named his son Christian after him, as did French director Roger Vadim.

Marquand died near Paris of Alzheimer's disease, aged 73.

Selected filmography 

Beauty and the Beast (1946) - Footman (uncredited)
Quai des Orfèvres (1947) - Bit Part (uncredited)
 (1951) - Dimitri
La demoiselle et son revenant (1952) - Le zouave
Lucrèce Borgia (1953) - Paolo
Senso (1954) - Un ufficiale boemo
Attila (1954) - Hun Leader
Human Torpedoes (1954) - Paolo
 Men in White (1955) - Philippon
 (1955) - Eugène Legrand
 More Whiskey for Callaghan (1955) - (uncredited)
L'Amant de lady Chatterley (1955) - L'amant de Bertha
And God Created Woman (1956) - Antoine Tardieu
No Sun in Venice (1957) - Michel Lafaurie
 (1958) - Philippe Vincent
One Life (1958) - Julien de Lamare
Temptation (1959) - Patrick
Llegaron dos hombres (1959) - Pablo Morales
J'irai cracher sur vos tombes (1959) - Joe Grant
 Sergeant X (1960) - Michel Rousseau
Tendre et Violente Élisabeth (1960) - Claude Walter
The Big Show (1960) - Walter
Sweet Deceptions (1960) - Enrico
 Final Accord (1960) - Frank Leroux
Love Play (1961) - Philippe
Prey for the Shadows (1961) - Bruno
Les Parisiennes (1962) - Christian Lénier (segment "Antonia")
Le crime ne paie pas (1962) - Louis Aubert (segment "L'affaire Fenayrou")
Un chien dans un jeu de quilles (1962) - Rodolphe
The Longest Day (1962) - Capitaine de Corvette Philippe Kieffer - Commando Leader
Les saintes-nitouches (1963) - Steve
La bonne soupe (1964) - Lucien Volard
Behold a Pale Horse (1964) - Zaganar
Lord Jim (1965) - the French Officer
The Flight of the Phoenix (1965) - Dr. Renaud
The Peking Medallion (1967) - Brandon
Who's Got the Black Box? (1967) - Robert Ford
Candy (1968) - Film director
Ciao Manhattan (1972) - Entrepreneur
Heiß und kalt (1972)
Victory at Entebbe (1976, TV Movie) - Captain Dukas
The Other Side of Midnight (1977) - Armand Gautier
 (1977) - Ashe / Bezzerides
Evening in Byzantium (1978) - Inspector DuBois
Beggarman, Thief (1979) - Inspector Charboneau
Le Maître-nageur (1979) - Paul Jouriace
 (1979) - Georges Julienne 
Apocalypse Now Redux (1979) - Hubert de Marais
Brigade mondaine: La secte de Marrakech (1979) - Père Peter
Je vous aime (1980) - Victor
Choice of Arms (1981) - Jean
Chassé-croisé (1982)
Emmanuelle 4 (1984) - Docteur Santano
Next Summer (1985) - Vierre
Adieu Blaireau (1985) - Victor

Notes

External links
 

1927 births
2000 deaths
Male actors from Marseille
Deaths from dementia in France
Deaths from Alzheimer's disease
French male film actors
French film directors
Bisexual male actors
French male screenwriters
20th-century French screenwriters
French people of Arab descent
French people of Spanish descent
French LGBT screenwriters
20th-century French male actors
20th-century French male writers
20th-century French LGBT people
French bisexual writers